Agorapocalypse is the fourth full-length studio album by American grindcore band Agoraphobic Nosebleed (ANb). It was released through Relapse Records on April 14, 2009, in the United States, and April 20 internationally. The album was recorded by ANb's guitarist Scott Hull at his Visceral Sound studios; Hull also wrote the drum parts using Toontrack's Drumkit from Hell in his digital audio workstation. This is also the band's only album with vocalist Katherine Katz. Agorapocalypses cover artwork was designed by German illustrator Florian Bertmer.

Artwork
The cover art for Agorapocalypse was drawn by German illustrator Florian Bertmer, who had previously designed the covers for ANb's Bestial Machinery (Discography Volume 1), Agoraphobic Nosebleed / Kill the Client and the inner-sleeve illustration for the group's 1999 split with Converge, The Poacher Diaries. Bertmer, vocalist J. Randall, and guitarist Scott Hull discussed the themes of the album art by phone and agreed to give it an "old-school thrashcore vibe", because of ANb's new musical direction. Agorapocalypse'''s design was also inspired by the Mad Marc Rude illustration for the Misfits' Earth A.D., which Bertmer defined as "insanely detailed". Bertmer also explained that "[he] tried to incorporate as many iconic characters to give the whole piece a claustrophobic appearance."

Bertmer initially created an outline black-and-white ink drawing measuring  square; he spent about two weeks sketching and one week drawing, then colored it on a computer. He stylized depictions of "nuclear war, drug use, police brutality, and a greedy businessman—the art is less shocking to the senses by its vivid colors and comic-like appearance." The green head in the middle of Agorapocalypses cover art is based on a photo of Bertmer himself.

Release
To promote Agorapocalypse, ANb made the album available for streaming in its entirety at www.agorapocalypse.com on April 13, 2009. Agorapocalypse was released through Relapse Records, on April 14 in North America and April 20 internationally. The album was issued on CD, a limited edition LP packaged with a  square full-color, 28-page booklet, and a mailorder-only longbox CD set limited to 1,000 copies that includes a  full-color poster, four-piece pin set and  embroidered patch. According to Nielsen SoundScan, Agorapocalypse sold around 1,300 copies in the United States in its first week of release, and peaked at number 41 on the Billboard's Top Heatseekers chart.

The Japanese edition included four bonus tracks, taken from their split with Insect Warfare.

Reception

Greg Pratt of Exclaim! magazine defined Agorapocalypse as "shockingly straight-ahead", while About.com summarized the album by saying "Agorapocalypse might lack a bit of the deviant vibe of ANb's past work, but there's still thrash, grind and a liberal dose of madness."

Unlike ANb's previous releases, on Agorapocalypse the group slowed down its sound to a thrashcore style of the 1980s. With this shift in sound, Cosmo Lee of Pitchfork Media was more critical, stating that "Agorapocalypse'' is disappointingly listenable. Song lengths are up, exceeding two and three minutes, and the songwriting has diversified. Instead of simply beating listeners into a pulp, songs now speed up, slow down, and breathe."

Track listing
All songs written and composed by Scott Hull.

Personnel
Katherine Katz – vocals
Jay Randall – vocals
Richard Johnson – vocals
Scott Hull – guitar, bass, drum programming, engineering, mixing, mastering
Matthew F. Jacobson – production
Florian Bertmer – artwork

References

2009 albums
Agoraphobic Nosebleed albums
Relapse Records albums